The 2010–11 Montenegrin First League (also known as T-Com 1.CFL for sponsorship reasons) was the fifth season of the top-tier football in Montenegro. The season began on 14 August 2010 and ended on 28 May 2011. Rudar were the defending champions having won their first Montenegrin championship last season.

Teams 
Kom were directly relegated to the Montenegrin Second League after finishing 12th last season. Their place was taken by Second League champions Mladost Podgorica.

10th-placed Mornar and 11th-placed Berane had to compete in two-legged relegation play-offs. Mornar kept their place in the First League by beating Second League third place finisher Bratstvo Cijevna 3–1 on aggregate. On the other hand, Berane were relegated after losing to Second League runners-up Bar 5–4 on penalties after the two clubs ended 2–2 on aggregate.

Stadia and locations

League table

Results
The schedule consisted of three rounds. During the first two rounds, each team played each other once home and away for a total of 22 matches. The pairings of the third round were then set according to the standings after the first two rounds, giving every team a third game against each opponent for a total of 33 games per team.

First and second round

Third round
Key numbers for pairing determination (number marks position after 22 games):

Relegation play-offs
The 10th-placed team (against the 3rd-placed team of the Second League) and the 11th-placed team (against the runners-up of the Second League) will both compete in two-legged relegation play-offs after the end of the season.

Summary

Matches

Sutjeska won 1–0 on aggregate.

1–1 on aggregate. Berane won on away goals.

Top scorers

See also
 2010–11 Montenegrin Cup

References

External links
 Official page at Montenegrin FA website

Montenegrin First League seasons
Monte
1